Boxing Day is a 2007 Australian film directed by Kriv Stenders.

Synopsis
The film blends documentary with fiction, as it shows 82 minutes in the life of an ex-convict and recovering alcoholic.

Cast
 Richard Green as Chris
 Tammy Anderson as Donna
 Syd Brisbane as Dave
 Stuart Clark as Owen
 Catriona Hadden as Cathy
 Misty Sparrow as Brooke
 Ming Jeng Chew as himself

Production
It was partly funded by the Adelaide Film Festival.

Only one professional actor, Syd Brisbane, is used in the film, and much of the script is improvised. The 82 minutes are shot in 12 takes.

Release
The film premiered at the third edition of the Adelaide Film Festival in 2007.

Accolades
Boxing Day was nominated for the FIPRESCI Award and International Feature Award at the Adelaide Film Festival, Best Direction in a Feature film at the Australian Directors Guild's ADG Awards, and IF Awards for Best Acting (Richard Green) and Best Direction. Green won an acting award at the Montréal Festival of New Cinema, with a special mention to Stenders for direction.

It was selected by the ADG for entry to the Directors Guild of America's Directors Finder Series in 2007.

References

External links

Australian documentary films
Films directed by Kriv Stenders
2000s English-language films
Australian drama films
2000s Australian films